A by-election was held for the New South Wales Legislative Assembly electorate of Hamilton on 5 October 1928 because of the death of David Murray.

Dates

Result

David Murray died.

See also
Electoral results for the district of Hamilton (New South Wales)
List of New South Wales state by-elections

References

1928 elections in Australia
New South Wales state by-elections
1920s in New South Wales